Mérieux NutriSciences offers practical testing, auditing, consulting, training, and research solutions to meet the needs of manufacturers, food processors, caterers and retailers. The company is legally headquartered in Chicago. A subsidiary of Institut Mérieux, Mérieux NutriSciences employs more than 8000 employees in 27 countries.

Overview 

Mérieux NutriSciences is present in 27 countries through more than 100 laboratories.

History 
 1967: Creation by Dr. John H. Silliker in Chicago of Silliker, a food focused solutions company. 
 1997: Acquisition of Silliker by Institut Mérieux
 2011: The Group is officially named Mérieux NutriSciences 

In 1897, Marcel Mérieux, a student of Louis Pasteur, founded Institut Mérieux. 
The Institut Mérieux was then directed by Dr. Charles Mérieux and later by Alain Mérieux and became the leader in the field of human and veterinary vaccines. Until 1994, the Mérieux family managed several companies in this area before withdrawing from the vaccinology work. 
Meanwhile in Chicago, Silliker, a company in the field of food safety and quality was created in 1967 by Dr. John H. Silliker, a microbiologist known for his work on Salmonella.
The Mérieux Family acquired Siliker in the 1990s. The company was renamed Mérieux NutriSciences in 2011.

Acquisitions
Mérieux NutriSciences has completed more than 47 acquisitions since 2007. The company has a worldwide presence, with sites in Europe, North America, Asia, Latin America, the Middle East, and Africa.

More recent acquisitions

2019
 Swiss Food (Germany) 
 Institut Kirchhoff (Germany) 
 KTBA (Netherlands) 
 EcamRicert (Italy) 
Acumen Scientific (Malaysia) 
ALT (Ireland)

2020 

 CPG Lab (Italy) 
 QMS Consult (Denmark) 
 Sichuan ZhongAn Testing and ZhongOu United Certification (China)
 Chestnut Labs (USA)

2021 

 UCGS (China) 
 Dyad Labs (USA)

References

Companies based in Chicago
Laboratories
Food and drink companies of the United States